J. E. Dunn Construction Group is a privately owned construction company in the United States. In 2011, the company was ranked 25th in Engineering News-Record's top 400 contractors; Forbes Magazine reported it was the 186th largest private company in the nation in 2010. Its headquarters are in downtown Kansas City, Missouri.

History
J.E. Dunn Construction was founded by John Ernest Dunn in 1924 in Kansas City, Missouri. The company began expanding to other cities in the 1990s. In 2020, J.E. Dunn was honored as a Best Place to Work in Kansas City by the Kansas City Business Journal.

References

External links
J. E. Dunn Construction Group Official Web Site

Companies based in Kansas City, Missouri
Construction and civil engineering companies of the United States